The 2001–02 USC Trojans men's basketball team represented the University of Southern California during the 2001–02 NCAA Division I men's basketball season. Led by head coach Henry Bibby, they played their home games at the L. A. Sports Arena in Los Angeles, California as members of the Pac-10 Conference. The Trojans finished the season with a record of 22–10 (12–6 Pac-10, 2nd) and made the NCAA tournament.

Roster

Schedule and results

|-
!colspan=9 style=| Non-conference regular season

|-
!colspan=9 style=| Pac-10 regular season

|-
!colspan=9 style=| Pac-10 Tournament

|-
!colspan=9 style=| NCAA Tournament

Rankings

References

Usc Trojans
USC Trojans men's basketball seasons
USC
USC Trojans
USC Trojans